Wildflower is the fifth studio album by American singer-songwriter Sheryl Crow, first released September 27, 2005. Although the album debuted at No. 2 on the Billboard 200, it received mixed reviews and was not as commercially successful as previous albums, having also peaked at No. 25 on the UK Album Chart (where all her previous studio albums had been Top 10 successes).

In December 2005, however, the album was nominated for a Best Pop Vocal Album Grammy Award, while Sheryl Crow was nominated for a Best Female Pop Vocal Performance Grammy Award for the song "Good Is Good".

The album was certified platinum in the U.S. in December 2005, and as of January 2008, it had sold 949,000 units (over the counter) there.

A deluxe edition of the CD was also released, which contains an additional DVD featuring acoustic versions of many of the album's tracks, as well as the promotional video for the lead single "Good Is Good".

Track listing

Charts

Year-end charts

Personnel

 Abe Laboriel Jr. – Drums
 Ali Helnwein – String Arrangements
 Allen Sides – String Engineer
 Andy Sharp – Assistant Engineer
 Bob Ludwig – Mastering
 Brandon Duncan – Assistant Engineer
 Brian MacLeod – Drums, Acoustic Guitar
 Brian Vibberts – Assistant Engineer
 Bruce Kaphan – Pedal Steel
 Carter Smith – Photography
 Daniel Chase – Casio, Drums, engineer, Percussion, Programming
 Dave Way – Engineer
 David Campbell – String Arrangements
 Dean Baskerville – Engineer
 Drew Vonderhaar – Assistant Engineer
 Eric Danchick – Assistant Engineer
 Errin Familia – Assistant Engineer
 Greg Leisz – Baritone Guitar, Pedal Steel
 Gustavo Papaleo – Cover Photo
 Jamie Muhoberac – Keyboards
 Jeff Moses – Assistant Engineer
 Jeff Rothschild – Drums, engineer, Mixing, Programming
 Jeff Trott – Bass, Drum Programming, Acoustic Guitar, Electric Guitar, Keyboards, Piano, producer, Slide Balalaika, Synthesizer Bass, Background Vocals, Wurlitzer
 Jimmy Hoyson – Assistant Engineer
 Joel Derouin – Concert Master
 John Shanks – Banjo, Bass, Acoustic Guitar, Electric Guitar, Keyboards, Mixing, producer, Background Vocals
 Keith Schreiner – Drum Programming
 Kevin Harp – Assistant Engineer
 Mike Elizondo – Bass
 Pam Wertheimer – Production Coordination
 Psyop – Art Direction, Design, Illustrations
 Roger Joseph Manning Jr. – Piano
 Scooter Weintraub – Management
 Shari Sutcliffe – Contractor, Production Coordination
 Sheryl Crow – Bass, Acoustic Guitar, Harmony Vocals, Keyboards, Piano, producer, Vocals, Background Vocals, Wurlitzer
 Sheryl Nields – Cover Photo, Photography
 Steve Churchyard – String Engineer
 Trina Shoemaker – Engineer

References

External links
 

Sheryl Crow albums
2005 albums
Albums produced by John Shanks
A&M Records albums